Wittenberg Mountain, locally "the Wittenberg," is a mountain located in Ulster County, New York. 
The mountain is part of the Burroughs Range of the Catskill Mountains.
Wittenberg is flanked to the southwest by Cornell Mountain and to the northeast by Terrace Mountain.

Wittenberg Mountain stands within the watershed of Esopus Creek, which drains into the Hudson River, and into New York Bay. 
The northwest and northeast slopes of Wittenberg Mtn. drain into Woodland Creek, thence into Esopus Creek. 
The southeast side of Wittenberg drains into Wittenberg Brook, thence into Maltby Hollow Brook, Bush Kill, and Esopus Creek at Ashokan Reservoir.

Wittenberg Mountain is within the Slide Mountain Wilderness of New York's Catskill State Park. 
Wittenberg Mountain is one of the 35 peaks in the Catskills greater than 3,500 feet elevation, and is a required ascent for membership in the Catskill Mountain 3500 Club.

See also 
 List of mountains in New York

Notes

External links 

 
 

Catskill High Peaks
Mountains of Ulster County, New York
Mountains of New York (state)